Browns Creek, Brown's Creek, or Brown Creek may refer to:

Browns Creek (Huntsville Creek), in Luzerne County, Pennsylvania
Browns Creek Township, Red Lake County, Minnesota
Browns Canyon Wash, a tributary of the Los Angeles River
 Brown's Creek (St. Croix River) a tributary of the St. Croix River in Minnesota
Browns Creek (Cape Fear River tributary), a stream in Bladen County, North Carolina
Brown Creek, a stream in Pennsylvania
Browns Creek (South Carolina)
Browns Creek (Henderson County, Tennessee)
Browns Creek (Utah), a stream in Utah